Anglim Trimble Gallery, formerly Gallery Paule Anglim, and Anglim Gilbert Gallery, is a contemporary commercial art gallery which is located at Minnesota Street Project, 1275 Minnesota Street, San Francisco, California The gallery was founded by Paule Anglim (1923 –2015) in the early 1970s.

The gallery specializes in exhibiting works from West Coast art movements. Following Anglim's passing in the spring of 2015, the gallery was re-opened under the lead of her long-term director, Ed Gilbert, and renamed Anglim Gilbert Gallery. After the death of Gilbert in 2020, it was subsequently renamed Anglim Trimble Gallery under the directorship of Shannon Trimble. The gallery has been located at the Minnesota Street Project since spring of 2016.

Movements 

 California Beat artists
 Bay Area Conceptualists
 Experimental California art movements

Artists 

 Terry Allen
 Anne Appleby
 Robert Bechtle
 John Beech
 Nayland Blake
 Louise Bourgeois
 Joan Brown
 John Buck
 Bull.Miletic
 Deborah Butterfield
 Dean Byington
 Jerome Caja
 Carter
 James Castle
 Enrique Chagoya
 Anne Chu
 Travis Collinson
 Bruce Conner
 Jean Conner
 Eleanor Coppola
 Nathaniel Dorsky
 Ala Ebtekar
 Bruno Fazzolari
 Vincent Fecteau
 Louise Fishman
 Terry Fox
 Ann Hamilton
 David Hannah
 Lynn Hershman Leeson
 Mildred Howard
 David Ireland
 Colter Jacobsen
 Jess
 Paul Kos
 Tony Labat
 Judith Linhares
 Tom Marioni
 Andrew Masullo
 Barry McGee
 Jim Melchert
 Ruby Neri
 Tony Oursler
 Gay Outlaw
 Hung-Chih Peng
 J. John Priola
 Rigo 23
 Clare Rojas
 Annabeth Rosen
 John Roloff
 Richard Shaw
 Katherine Sherwood
 Dean Smith
 M. Louise Stanley
 Frances Stark
 Oriane Stender
 Christine Streuli
 Robert Stone
 Canan Tolon
 William Tucker
 Catherine Wagner
 Carrie Mae Weems
 Pamela Wilson-Ryckman
 Xiaoze Xie
 John Zurier

References

External links 

 

Art museums and galleries in San Francisco
Companies based in San Francisco